Reinaldo Ernst E. (Heribert) Pünder (January 12, 1939 – January 16, 2011) was the Roman Catholic Bishop of the Roman Catholic Diocese of Coroatá, Brazil.

Born in Germany, Pünder was ordained to the priesthood in 1964. In 1978, he was appointed bishop to the Coroatá Diocese dying in office.

Notes

20th-century Roman Catholic bishops in Brazil
1939 births
2011 deaths
21st-century Roman Catholic bishops in Brazil
20th-century German Roman Catholic priests
Roman Catholic bishops of Coroatá